William Lamont may refer to:
 William T. Lamont (1830–1908), American merchant and politician from New York
 William C. Lamont (1827–?), American lawyer and politician from New York
 Bill Lamont (1926–1996), Scottish footballer
 Billy Lamont (born 1936), Scottish footballer and manager